The Gabon of the Future is a political party in Gabon led by Sylvestre Oyouomi.

History
Established by Oyouomi in 1999, the party  won one seat in the Senate in the 2003 elections, but lost it in the 2009 elections.

In 2010 the party joined the Republican Majority for Emergence, a bloc supporting the Gabonese Democratic Party.

References

Political parties in Gabon
1999 establishments in Gabon
Political parties established in 1999